Julian may refer to:

People
 Julian (emperor) (331–363), Roman emperor from 361 to 363
 Julian (Rome), referring to the Roman gens Julia, with imperial dynasty offshoots
 Saint Julian (disambiguation), several Christian saints
 Julian (given name), people with the given name Julian
 Julian (surname), people with the surname Julian
 Julian (singer), Russian pop singer

Places 
 Julian, California, a census-designated place in San Diego County
 Julian, Kansas, an unincorporated community in Stanton County
 Julian, Nebraska, a village in Nemaha County
 Julian, North Carolina, a census-designated place in Guilford County
 Julian, Pennsylvania, an unincorporated community and census-designated place in Centre County
 Julian, West Virginia, an unincorporated community in Boone County

Other uses 
 Julian (album), a 1976 album by Pepper Adams
 Julian (novel), a 1964 novel by Gore Vidal about the emperor
 Julian (play), an 1823 play by Mary Russell Mitford
 Julian (geology), a substage of the Carnian stage of the Late Triassic Period
 Julian (Trailer Park Boys), a fictional character

See also

 Julian calendar, introduced by Julius Caesar in 46 BC (708 AUC), a reform of the Roman calendar
 Julian day, the continuous count of days since the beginning of the Julian Period
 Julian Alps, part of the Alps in Italy and Slovenia
 Académie Julian, a former art school in Paris
 Count Julian (novel), a 1970 novel by Juan Goytisolo
 Julianus (disambiguation)
 Jullien, a French surname
 Julienne (disambiguation)
 Julien Inc., a stainless steel fabrication company
 Frederick Juliand (1806–?), New York politician